Glasenberg may refer to:

 Glasenberg, district of Lambach, Moselle
 Ivan Glasenberg (born 1957), businessman